The following provides a partial list of products manufactured under the Canon brand.

Other products manufactured and/or service-rendered under the Canon brand may not appear here. Such products may include office or industrial application devices, wireless LAN products, and semiconductor and precision products.

Slide, 8 mm and Super 8 mm film projectors

Slide projectors 
 Auto Timer Slide Projector (1959) 
 Auto Slide Projector (1959) 
 Slidester (Apr 1962) 
 Slidester 300 (May 1964)
 Auto Slide 500 (Mar 1968)
 Slidester 302 (Jan 1970)
 Auto Slide 650EF (Jul 1973)

Regular 8 mm projectors 
 Canon P-8 (1958)
 Auto Projector 8Z (1963)
 Cinestar P-8 (1965)

Dual Gauge (Regular, Single orSuper 8 mm) projectors 
 P-8 Cinestar S (1965 – Feb 1967)
 P-8 Cinestar S-2/Cine Projector S-2 (1967 – Jul 1969)
 Canovision 8 (1967)
 Cine Projector P-400 (1968)
 Cinestar S-400/Cine Projector S-400 (1969)
 Canovision 8-2 (1970)
 Cine Projector T-1 (1972)

Single 8 or Super 8 mm projectors 
 Sound Projector PS-1000 (Mar 1977)
 Cine Projector P-777 (1977)

Cameras

Rangefinder film cameras 
Seiki Kogaku (now Canon) began to develop and subsequently to produce rangefinder cameras with the Kwanon prototype in 1933, based on the Leica II 35mm camera, with separate rangefinder and view finder systems (3 windows). Production began with the Hansa Canon on the Leica III format through World War II.  Post war, Canon resumed production of pre-war designs in early 1946 with the JII viewfinder and the S1 rangefinder.  But in late 1946 they introduced the SII which departed from the Leica design by offering a combined viewfinder/rangefinder system, reducing the windows on the front of the camera to two. However, in most other respects these cameras remained visually similar to the Leica III.

 Kwanon (1933) Nippon Kogaku (now Nikon) provided Seiki Kogaku with funding, Nikkor lenses, rangefinders, and technical assistance
 Canon (1936) Known today as the "Original Canon" The viewfinder moved to the top of the camera, differing from the Leica
 Hansa Canon (1936) Omiya Trading Co marketed original Canon with the Hansa name above the Canon name on the top
 Canon S (1939) Standard model.  The word "Hansa" disappeared from the brand name, and was replaced with just "Canon" 
 Canon NS (1939) New Standard. A Canon S without the slow shutter speeds
 Canon J (1939) J stands for Junior a non-rangefinder model.
 Canon J II (1946) Similar if not the same as prewar cameras
 Canon S (1946) Similar if not the same as prewar cameras
 Canon S II (1946)  A redesign with combined range finder and viewfinder functions – two windows
 Canon II B (1949)
 Canon II C (1950)
 Canon III (1951)
 Canon IV (1951)
 Canon III A (1951)
 Canon IV S (1952)
 Canon II A (1952)
 Canon II D (1952)
 Canon IV SB (1952)
 Canon II AF (1953)
 Canon II F (1953)
 Canon II AX (1953)
 Canon II S (1954)
 Canon IV Sb2 (1954)
 Canon II S2 (1955)
 Canon II D2 (1955)
 Canon II F2 (1955)

In 1956, Canon departed from the Leica II Style and developed a more contemporary look, along with a Contax style self-timer level to the left of the lens mount.   This was the first Canon camera with a swing-open camera back for film loading. Upper end models had a new three-mode viewfinders and winding triggers.

 Canon VT (1956)
 Canon L2 (1957)
 Canon VT Deluxe (1957)
 Canon L1 (1957)
 Canon L3 (1957)
 Canon VL (1958)
 Canon VL2 (1958)
 Canon VI T (1958)
 Canon VI L (1958)
 Canon P (Populaire) (1959)
 Canonet (1961) Lower priced simpler camera
 Canon 7 (1961) Including a built-in meter and improved viewfinder system.

Canon partnered with US manufacturer Bell & Howell between 1961–1976 and a few Canon products were sold in the US under the Bell & Howell brand e.g. Canon 7 Rangefinder, Canon EX-EE, and the Canon TX.

SLR cameras 
(See also:Template:Table of Canon SLR)

Canonflex SLR 
Canon developed and produced the Canon R lens mount for film SLR cameras in 1959. The FL lens mount replaced R-mounts in 1964.
 Canonflex (1959) – Planned as Canon's first professional-class SLR camera body, but it was not successful.  Available with builtin motor-drive option (not detachable).
 Canonflex R2000 (1960) – An upgrade with 1/2000 shutter speed (up from 1/1000)
 Canonflex RP (1960) – simplified Canonflex without the interchangeable prism/viewer
 Canonflex RM (1962) – A redesign of the RP with builtin metering and a lower profile prism.  Offered with an f/1.2 58mm lens option

Details

FL-mount SLR 
Canon developed and produced the Canon FL lens-mount standard for film SLR cameras from 1964 to replace the Canon R lens-mount standard. The FD lens mount standard replaced FL-mounts in 1971.
 Canon FX (1964)
 Canon FP (1964)
 Canon Pellix (1965)
 Canon FT QL (1966)
 Canon Pellix QL (1966)
 Canon TL (1968)

EE-mount SLR 
In 1969 Canon introduced an economy camera/lens system where the rear three elements (in two groups) were built-on-to the camera, and several front element options could be interchanged.  This had been used by Zeiss-Ikon in their mid-level cameras of their Contaflex series, and by Kodak in early interchangeable lenses for the top-end Retina series (later going to full lenses).  Canon offered four lens options: 35mm f/3.5, 50mm f/1.8, 95mm f/3.5, and 125mm f/3.5.

Through the lens metering was center weighted and automatic exposure was shutter speed priority.  Only two cameras were offered and the line was not successful.

 Canon EXEE (1969)
 Canon EX Auto (1972) improved auto flash features

FD-mount SLR 
Canon developed and produced the Canon FD lens mount standard for film SLR cameras from 1971 to replace the FL lens mount standard.
The FD mount had two variants – original lenses used a breechlock collar to mount whilst later versions used a standard bayonet twist lock with a short twist action.
The EF lens mount standard superseded FD-mounts in 1987. Canon ceased to produce FD-mount cameras in 1994.

F series 
 Canon F-1 (1971) – Reputed as Canon's first successful professional-class SLR camera body.  The 1959 Canonflex professional camera system (above) failed and was down-featured for the consumer market.
 Canon FTb (1971)
 Canon FTbn (1973)
 Canon EF (1973)
 Canon TLb (1974)
 Canon TX (1975)
 Canon F-1n (1976)
 Canon New F-1 (1981)

A series 
 Canon AE-1 (1976)
 Canon AT-1 (1977)
 Canon A-1 (1978)
 Canon AV-1 (1979)
 Canon AE-1 Program (1981)
 Canon AL-1 (1982)

T series 
 Canon T50 (1983)
 Canon T70 (1984)
 Canon T80 (1985)
 Canon T90 (1986)
 Canon T60 (1990)

EOS 
In 1987, Canon introduced the EOS Single-lens reflex camera system along with the EF lens-mount standard to replace the 16-year-old FD lens-mount standard; EOS became the sole SLR camera-system used by Canon . Canon also used EOS for its digital SLR cameras.   All current film and digital SLR cameras produced by Canon  use the EOS autofocus system. Canon introduced this system in 1987 along with the EF lens mount standard. The last non-EOS based SLR camera produced by Canon, the Canon T90 of 1986,  is widely regarded as the template for the EOS line of camera bodies, although the T90 employed the older FD lens-mount standard.

For a detailed list of EOS Film and digital SLR cameras, see Canon EOS.

Digital SLR cameras 

See Canon EOS
 Entry level cameras
 EOS 300D/Digital Rebel/Kiss Digital (discontinued)
 EOS 350D/Digital Rebel XT/Kiss Digital N (discontinued)
 EOS 400D/Digital Rebel XTi/Kiss Digital X (discontinued)
 EOS 450D/Rebel XSi/Kiss X2 (discontinued)
 EOS 500D/Rebel T1i/Kiss X3 (discontinued)
 EOS 550D/Rebel T2i/Kiss X4 (discontinued)
 EOS 600D/Rebel T3i/Kiss X5 (discontinued)
 EOS 650D/Rebel T4i/Kiss X6i (discontinued)
 EOS 700D/Rebel T5i/Kiss X7i (discontinued)
 EOS 750D/Rebel T6i/Kiss X8i 
 EOS 760D/Rebel T6s/8000D
 EOS 800D/Rebel T7i/Kiss X9i
 EOS 850D/Rebel T8i/Kiss X10i
 EOS 100D/Rebel SL1/Kiss X7 (discontinued)
 EOS 200D/Rebel SL2/Kiss X9
 EOS 250D/Rebel SL3/Kiss X10
 EOS 1000D/Rebel XS/Kiss F (discontinued)
 EOS 1100D/Rebel T3/Kiss X50 (discontinued)
 EOS 1200D/Rebel T5/Kiss X70 (discontinued)
 EOS 1300D/Rebel T6/Kiss X80 (discontinued)
 EOS 1500D/EOS 2000D/Rebel T7/Kiss X90
 EOS 3000D/EOS 4000D/Rebel T100
 Advanced amateur cameras
 Canon EOS 77D (EOS 9000D in Japan)
 Semi-professional and mid-range cameras
 EOS D30 (discontinued)
 EOS D60 (discontinued)
 EOS 10D (discontinued)
 EOS 20D (discontinued)
 EOS 20Da (discontinued) – designed for astrophotography
 EOS 30D (discontinued)
 EOS 40D (discontinued)
 EOS 50D (discontinued)
 EOS 60D (discontinued)
 EOS 60Da – designed for astrophotography
 EOS 70D (discontinued)
 EOS 77D
 EOS 80D
 EOS 90D
 Premium cameras
 APS-C sensor
 EOS 7D (discontinued)
 EOS 7D Mark II
 Full-frame sensor
 EOS 5D (discontinued)
 EOS 5D Mark II (discontinued)
 EOS 5D Mark III (discontinued)
 EOS 5D Mark IV
 EOS 5Ds
 EOS 5Ds R
 EOS 6D (discontinued)
 EOS 6D Mark II
 Professional cameras:
EOS-1D (discontinued)
 EOS-1Ds (discontinued)
 EOS-1D Mark II (discontinued)
 EOS-1Ds Mark II (discontinued)
 EOS-1D Mark II N (discontinued)
 EOS-1D Mark III (discontinued)
 EOS-1Ds Mark III (discontinued)
 EOS-1D Mark IV (discontinued)
 EOS-1D X (discontinued)
 EOS-1D X Mark II (discontinued)
 EOS-1D C (cinema-oriented)
 EOS-1D X Mark III

Mirrorless interchangeable-lens cameras 

APS-C sensor
 Canon EOS M
 Canon EOS M2 (not available in North America)
 Canon EOS M3
 Canon EOS M10
 Canon EOS M5
 Canon EOS M6
 Canon EOS M6 Mark II 
 Canon EOS M100
 Canon EOS M50
 Canon EOS M50 Mark II
 Canon EOS R7
 Canon EOS R10
Full-Frame sensor 
 Canon EOS R
 Canon EOS RP
 Canon EOS Ra (designed for Astrophotography)
 Canon EOS R5
 Canon EOS R6
 Canon EOS R6 Mark II
 Canon EOS R3

Cinema EOS cameras 

Canon Cinema EOS cameras as of 2022 May.

 Canon EOS C700 FF
 Canon EOS C700
 Canon EOS C500 Mark II
 Canon EOS C300 Mark III
 Canon EOS C300 Mark II
 Canon EOS C200
 Canon EOS C100 Mark II
 Canon EOS C70
 Canon EOS R5 C - 8K video and 45MP stills; smallest Cinema EOS camera

35 mm compact cameras 
 AF35M (Sure Shot, Autoboy)
 Canon Prima 70F Zoom
 Canon Snappy
 Canon Sure Shot 76 Zoom Date S-AF

35 mm compact half-format cameras 18×24 mm 
 Demi (Feb 1963)
 Dial 35 (clockwork winder) (Nov 1963)
 Demi S (Sep 1964)
 Demi C (Apr 1965)
 Demi EE17 (May 1966)
 Demi EE28 (Apr 1967)
 Dial 35-2 (Apr 1968)
 Demi Rapid (Jun 1965) Agfa Cassette
 Dial Rapid (Oct 1965) Agfa Cassette

35 mm rangefinder cameras 
 Canon II (1949)
 Canon VT (1956)
 Canon P (1959)
 Canonet (1961)
 Canon 7 (1961)
 Canonet S (1964)
 Canonet QL17, QL19, QL19E and QL25 (all 1965)
 Canonet 28 (1968)
 Canonet QL17 new (1969) and QL17-L new (1970)
 Canonet 28 new (1971), QL19 new (1971)
 Canonet G-III QL17 (1972), G-III 19 (1972)
 Canon A35F (1978)

Regular 8 mm cameras 
 Cine 8-S (1956), not sold to the public
 Cine 8-T (1956)
 Reflex Zoom 8 (1959)
 Reflex Zoom 8-2 (1961)
 Reflex Zoom 8-3 (1962)
 Motor Zoom 8 EEE (1962)
 Cine Canonet 8 (1963)
 Cine Zoom 512 (1964)

Single 8 mm cameras 
 Single 8 518 (1965)
 Single 8 518 SV (1970)

Super 8 mm cameras 

 1014 XL-S Canosound
 814 XL-S Canosound
 Autozoom 1218 Super 8 (1968)
 Zoom 250 Super 8 (1969)
 Autozoom 1014 Electronic (1973)
 310 XL (1975)
 312 XL-S (1977)
 AF 310 XL (1982)
 AF 310 XL-S (1982)
 Zoom 318 Super 8 (1965)
 Autozoom 318M (1972)
 Zoom 318 Super 8 MB
 Autozoom 512 XL Electronic (1975)
 Autozoom 514 XL Electronic
 514 XL-S (1976)
 AF 514 XL-S (1980)
 Autozoom 518 SV (1971)
 Autozoom 518 Super 8 (1967)
 Zoom 518 Super 8 (1964)
 Autozoom 814 Super 8 (1967)
 Autozoom 814 Electronic (1972)
 814 XL Electronic (1977)
 Zoom DS8 (1970)

16mm cameras 
 Scoopic 16 (1965)
 Scoopic 16M (1973)
 Scoopic 16MN (1974)
 Scoopic 16MS (1977)
 Sound Scoopic 100 (1970)
 Sound Scoopic 200 (1970)
 Sound Scoopic 200S (1972)
 Sound Scoopic 200SE (1972)
 Sound Scoopic 200 S10 (1972)
 Systema Sound 16 (1979)

Digital compact cameras

IXUS/IXY/PowerShot ELPH series 
 Sold as PowerShot Digital ELPH in US and Canada
 Sold as IXY Digital in Japan
 Sold as Digital IXUS in Europe and Southeast Asia
US names listed

 Canon powerShot S45
 Canon PowerShot S100
 Canon PowerShot S110
 Canon PowerShot S200
 Canon PowerShot S230
 Canon PowerShot S300
 Canon PowerShot S330
 Canon PowerShot S400
 Canon PowerShot S410
 Canon PowerShot S500
 Canon PowerShot SD10
 Canon PowerShot SD20
 Canon PowerShot SD30
 Canon PowerShot SD40
 Canon PowerShot SD100
 Canon PowerShot SD110
 Canon PowerShot SD200
 Canon PowerShot SD300
 Canon PowerShot SD400
 Canon PowerShot SD430
 Canon PowerShot SD450
 Canon PowerShot SD500
 Canon PowerShot SD550
 Canon PowerShot SD600
 Canon PowerShot SD630
 Canon PowerShot SD640 No reference that this camera exist.
 Canon PowerShot SD700 IS
 Canon PowerShot SD750
 Canon PowerShot SD770 IS
 Canon PowerShot SD780 IS
 Canon PowerShot SD790 IS
 Canon PowerShot SD800 IS
 Canon PowerShot SD850 IS
 Canon PowerShot SD870 IS
 Canon PowerShot SD880 IS
 Canon PowerShot SD890 IS
 Canon PowerShot SD900
 Canon PowerShot SD940 IS
 Canon PowerShot SD950 IS
 Canon PowerShot SD960 IS
 Canon PowerShot SD970 IS
 Canon PowerShot SD980 IS
 Canon PowerShot SD990 IS
 Canon PowerShot SD1000
 Canon PowerShot SD1100 IS
 Canon PowerShot SD1200 IS
 Canon PowerShot SD1300 IS
 Canon PowerShot SD1400 IS
 Canon PowerShot SD3500 IS
 Canon PowerShot SD4000 IS
 Canon PowerShot SD4500 IS
 Canon PowerShot 110 HS
 Canon PowerShot 320 HS
 Canon PowerShot 340 HS
 Canon PowerShot 520 HS

Canon PowerShot digital cameras 

 Canon PowerShot 600

PowerShot A series 

 Canon PowerShot A5
 Canon PowerShot A5 Zoom
 Canon PowerShot A50
 Canon PowerShot A10
 Canon PowerShot A20
 Canon PowerShot A30
 Canon PowerShot A40
 Canon PowerShot A60
 Canon PowerShot A70
 Canon PowerShot A75
 Canon PowerShot A80
 Canon PowerShot A85
 Canon PowerShot A95
 Canon PowerShot A100
 Canon PowerShot A200
 Canon PowerShot A300
 Canon PowerShot A310
 Canon PowerShot A400
 Canon PowerShot A410
 Canon PowerShot A420
 Canon PowerShot A430
 Canon PowerShot A450
 Canon PowerShot A460
 Canon PowerShot A470
 Canon PowerShot A480
 Canon PowerShot A490 / A495
 Canon PowerShot A510
 Canon PowerShot A520
 Canon PowerShot A530
 Canon PowerShot A540
 Canon PowerShot A550
 Canon PowerShot A560
 Canon PowerShot A570 IS
 Canon PowerShot A580
 Canon PowerShot A590 IS
 Canon PowerShot A610
 Canon PowerShot A620
 Canon PowerShot A630
 Canon PowerShot A640
 Canon PowerShot A650 IS
 Canon PowerShot A700
 Canon PowerShot A710 IS
 Canon PowerShot A720 IS
 Canon PowerShot A800
 Canon PowerShot A810
 Canon PowerShot A1000 IS
 Canon PowerShot A1100 IS
 Canon PowerShot A1200
 Canon PowerShot A1300
 Canon PowerShot A1400
 Canon PowerShot A2000 IS
 Canon PowerShot A2200
 Canon PowerShot A2300 HD
 Canon PowerShot A2500
 Canon PowerShot A2600
 Canon PowerShot A3000 IS
 Canon PowerShot A3100 I
 Canon PowerShot A3150 IS
 Canon PowerShot A3200 IS
 Canon PowerShot A3300 IS
 Canon Powershot A3400 IS
 Canon Powershot A3500 IS
 Canon Powershot A4000 IS

PowerShot D series 
 Canon PowerShot D10
 Canon PowerShot D20
 Canon PowerShot D30

PowerShot E series 
 Canon PowerShot E1

PowerShot G series 
 Canon PowerShot G1
 Canon PowerShot G2
 Canon PowerShot G3
 Canon PowerShot G5
 Canon PowerShot G6
 Canon PowerShot G7
 Canon PowerShot G9
 Canon PowerShot G10
 Canon PowerShot G11
 Canon PowerShot G12
 Canon PowerShot G15
 Canon PowerShot G16
Canon PowerShot G1 X
Canon PowerShot G1 X MkII
Canon PowerShot G1 X MkIII
Canon PowerShot G3 X
Canon PowerShot G5 X
Canon PowerShot G5 X MkII
Canon PowerShot G7 X
Canon PowerShot G7 X MkII
Canon PowerShot G7 X MkIII
Canon PowerShot G9 X
Canon PowerShot G9 X MkII

PowerShot N series
 Canon PowerShot N100, has also rear-facing lens as smartphone, but front and rear lenses both together will take photo/video when the shutter is pressed and the rear lens image will appear in the corner of the big image from front lens as picture-in-picture, so the camera is called as a 'Story Camera'

PowerShot Pro series  
 Canon Powershot Pro1
 Canon Powershot Pro7d
 Canon Powershot Pro90 IS

PowerShot S series 

 Canon PowerShot S1 IS
 Canon PowerShot S2 IS
 Canon PowerShot S3 IS
 Canon PowerShot S5 IS
 Canon PowerShot S10
 Canon PowerShot S20
 Canon PowerShot S30
 Canon PowerShot S40
 Canon PowerShot S45
 Canon PowerShot S50
 Canon PowerShot S60
 Canon PowerShot S70
 Canon PowerShot S80
 Canon PowerShot S90
 Canon PowerShot S95
 Canon PowerShot S100
 Canon PowerShot S110
 Canon PowerShot S120
 Canon PowerShot SX1 IS
 Canon PowerShot SX10 IS
 Canon PowerShot SX20 IS
 Canon PowerShot SX30 IS
 Canon PowerShot SX40 HS
 Canon PowerShot SX50 HS
 Canon PowerShot SX60 HS
 Canon PowerShot SX70 HS
 Canon PowerShot SX100 IS
 Canon PowerShot SX110 IS
 Canon PowerShot SX120 IS
 Canon PowerShot SX130 IS
 Canon PowerShot SX150 IS
 Canon PowerShot SX160 IS
 Canon PowerShot SX200 IS
 Canon PowerShot SX210 IS
 Canon PowerShot SX220 HS
 Canon PowerShot SX230 HS (features GPS)
 Canon PowerShot SX240 HS
 Canon PowerShot SX260 HS (features GPS)
 Canon PowerShot SX270 HS
 Canon PowerShot SX280 HS (features GPS)
 Canon PowerShot SX400 IS
 Canon PowerShot SX410 IS
 Canon PowerShot SX420 IS
(first PowerShot camera with built-in Wi-Fi) 
 Canon PowerShot SX430 IS
(not officially sold in North America)
 Canon PowerShot SX500 IS
 Canon PowerShot SX510 HS
 Canon PowerShot SX520 HS
 Canon PowerShot SX530 HS
 Canon PowerShot SX540 HS
 Canon PowerShot SX600 HS
(first SX-Series based PowerShot camera to be more compact) 
 Canon PowerShot SX610 HS
 Canon PowerShot SX620 HS
 Canon PowerShot SX700 HS
 Canon PowerShot SX710 HS
 Canon PowerShot SX720 HS
 Canon PowerShot SX730 HS
(first Powershot camera with a flip screen for selfies and vlogs) 
 Canon PowerShot SX740 HS (features 4K recording)

PowerShot T series 
 Canon PowerShot TX1

Camcorders

Electronic dictionaries (only sold in Japan)

Canon Wordtank 

 Canon Wordtank V80
 Canon Wordtank V70
 Canon Wordtank V30
 Canon Wordtank G50
 Canon Wordtank C30
 Canon IDF-4600
 Canon IDF-2200E
 Canon IDF-3000
 Canon IDF-2100
 Canon IDF-1000
 Canon IDC-300

Portable flash

E line 
 Speedlite 200E

EG line 
 Speedlite 480EG

EX line 

 Canon Speedlite 90EX
 Canon Speedlite 220EX
 Canon Speedlite 270EX and Canon Speedlite 270EX II
 Canon Speedlite 320EX
 Canon Speedlite 380EX
 Canon Speedlite 420EX
 Canon Speedlite 430EX and Canon Speedlite 430EX II
 Canon Speedlite 550EX
 Canon Speedlite 580EX and Canon Speedlite 580EX II
 Canon Speedlite 600EX and Canon Speedlite 600EX II

EZ line 
Speedlite 300EZ,
Speedlite 420EZ,
Speedlite 430EZ,
Speedlite 540EZ

T line 
 Speedlite 300T
The 300T is a layover from the FD system, it was introduced with the FD mount Canon T90, but is compatible in TTL mode with most non-digital EF cameras.

Macro flashguns 
Macro Twin Lite MT-24EX, Macro Ring Lite MR-14EX, Macro Ring Lite ML-3

Remote flash trigger 
 Speedlite Transmitter ST-E2

Multifunction peripheral/digital copiers

imageRUNNER series 
All-in-One office printers manufactured from 2007 to 2013. The "iR" series uses Ultra Fast Rendering (UFR) printing system, and some models use UFR II, a page description language. 

 Canon imageRUNNER 2230
 Canon imageRUNNER 2270
 Canon imageRUNNER 2830
 Canon imageRUNNER 3570
 Canon imageRUNNER 5000
 Canon imageRUNNER 5075
 Canon imageRUNNER 5570
 Canon imageRUNNER 6570
 Canon imageRUNNER C5870
 Canon imageRUNNER C6870
 Canon imageRUNNER 7086
 Canon imageRUNNER 7095
 Canon imageRUNNER 7105
 Canon imageRUNNER 8070
 Canon imageRUNNER 110
 Canon imageRUNNER 150vp
 Canon imageRUNNER 2022N
 Canon imageRUNNER Advance c5035
 Canon imageRUNNER Advance c5045
 Canon imageRUNNER Advance c5045i
 Canon imageRUNNER Advance c5025
 Canon imageRUNNER Advance c5030
 Canon imageRUNNER Advance c7055
 Canon imageRUNNER Advance c7065
 Canon imageRUNNER Advance c9065
 Canon imageRUNNER Advance c9075

Manufactured as of 2022 color printers

 imageRUNNER ADVANCE DX C257/C357 Series
 imageRUNNER ADVANCE DX C3700 Series
 imageRUNNER ADVANCE DX C477 Series
 imageRUNNER ADVANCE DX C478 Series
 imageRUNNER ADVANCE DX C5800 Series
 imageRUNNER ADVANCE DX C7700 series
 imageRUNNER ADVANCE EQ80 C5200 Series
 imageRUNNER C1530 Series
 imageRUNNER C3226i

Manufactured as of 2022 black&white printers

 imageRUNNER 1643 II Series
 imageRUNNER ADVANCE DX 4700 Series
 imageRUNNER ADVANCE DX 6780i
 imageRUNNER ADVANCE DX 6800 Series
 imageRUNNER ADVANCE DX 717/617/527 Series
 imageRUNNER ADVANCE DX 8700 Series
 imageRUNNER ADVANCE EQ80 4200 Series
 imageRUNNER ADVANCE EQ80 6275i
 imageRUNNER 1600 Series
 imageRUNNER 2206
 imageRUNNER 2206iF
 imageRUNNER 2206N
 imageRUNNER 2425 Series
 imageRUNNER 2600 Series

Canon Laser series 
 Canon Color Laser Copier 1110
 Canon Color Laser Copier 1140
 Canon Color Laser Copier 1180
 Canon Color Laser Copier 3900
 Canon Color Laser Copier 3900+
 Canon Color Laser Copier 4000
 Canon Color Laser Copier 5100
 Canon LASER CLASS 2050P
 Canon LASER CLASS 310
 Canon LASER CLASS 510
 Canon LASER CLASS 650i
 Canon LASER CLASS 710
 Canon LASER CLASS 730i
 Canon LASER CLASS 810
 Canon LASER CLASS 830i
 FMF 2100 Facsimile System
 FMF 3100 Office Multifunctional System
 Canon Imagepress C1
 Canon Imagepress C6000
 Canon Imagepress C7000VP

CanoScan 
 LiDE (USB powered, LED lit)
 CR
 DR
 imageCLASS MF4890
 IS
 F Series

Computers

Canon Cat
Canon A-200
Canon AS-100

Portable computers

StarWriter
StarWriter Jet 300 — a word processor and Personal Publishing System.

NoteJet

Beginning in Spring 1993, Canon produced a series of notebooks with integrated inkjet printers called NoteJet. The initial price for the first-model NoteJet was U.S. $2,499. The NoteJet lineup was eventually discontinued, and computers belonging to the series are valued by collectors.

NoteJet 486
NoteJet 486 Model 2
NoteJet I
NoteJet II
NoteJet III
NoteJet IIIcx

Calculators 

 Canola 164P Desktop Calculator – Canon's third-generation electronic calculator introduced in 1970s
 Palmtronic
 Palmtronic F-6
 Canon Palmtronic LE-80M
 Canon TS-83H
 X Mark II – Design award-winning calculator
 LS-123K – Metallic Color series
 LS-103TUC – Japan Color series
 P170-DHV
 F-605G
 F-710
 AS-120
 AS-1200
 AS-8
 LS-88HI III
 LS-82Z
 LS-100TS
 Ai Note IN-3000, a PDA with handwritten input capability introduced in 1989

Printers 
Canon printers are supplied with Canon Advanced Printing Technology (CAPT), a printer driver software-stack developed by Canon. The company claims that its use of data compression reduces their printer's memory requirement, good quality compared to conventional laser printers, and also claim that it increases the data transfer rate when printing high-resolution graphics.
 Canon PJ-1080A colour inkjet – which was also available under another brandname.

BJ series 
Series introduced in the 1990s. Black & white only.

 Canon BJ-5
 Canon BJ-10E
 Canon BJ-10EX
 Canon BJ-20
 Canon BJ-30
 Canon BJ-30v
 Canon BJ-100
 Canon BJ-130
 Canon BJ-130E
 Canon BJ-200
 Canon BJ-200E
 Canon BJ-200EX
 Canon BJ-220JC
 Canon BJ-220JC II
 Canon BJ-220JS
 Canon BJ-220JS II
 Canon BJ-230
 Canon BJ-300
 Canon BJ-330
 Canon BJ535PD
 Canon BJ895PD

BJC series 
Series introduced in the 1990s.
Canon refers to inkjet printers as bubblejets, hence the frequent BJC-prefix (BubbleJet Color).

 Canon BJC-50
 Canon BJC-55
 Canon BJC-70
 Canon BJC-80
 Canon BJC-85
 Canon BJC-85W
 Canon BJC-210
 Canon BJC-210SP
 Canon BJC-240
 Canon BJC-250
 Canon BJC-255SP
 Canon BJC-600
 Canon BJC-600e
 Canon BJC-610
 Canon BJC-620
 Canon BJC-800
 Canon BJC-1000
 Canon BJC-2000
 Canon BJC-2010
 Canon BJC-2100
 Canon BJC-2100SP
 Canon BJC-2110
 Canon BJC-3000
 Canon BJC-4000
 Canon BJC-4100
 Canon BJC-4200
 Canon BJC-4300
 Canon BJC-4400
 Canon BJC-4550
 Canon BJC-5000
 Canon BJC-5100
 Canon BJC-5500
 Canon BJC-6000
 Canon BJC-6100
 Canon BJC-6200
 Canon BJC-6200S
 Canon BJC-6500
 Canon BJC-7000
 Canon BJC-7100
 Canon BJC-8000
 Canon BJC-8200
 Canon BJC-8500

i series 
In Japan, the models are denoted with a trailing "i", whereas in the rest of the world they are denoted with a leading "i". While the 50i corresponds to the i70, for all other corresponding models the numerical model numbers are identical.
The "X" denotes models sold under special dispensation by retail outlets in Europe.

 Canon i70
 Canon i80
 Canon i250
 Canon i450
 Canon i450X
 Canon i455
 Canon i455X
 Canon i470D
 Canon i475D
 Canon i550
 Canon i550X
 Canon i560
 Canon i560X
 Canon i850
 Canon i860
 Canon i865
 Canon i900D
 Canon i905D
 Canon i950
 Canon i960
 Canon i965
 Canon i990
 Canon i6100
 Canon i6500
 Canon i9100
 Canon i9900
 Canon i9950
 Canon 50i
 Canon 80i
 Canon 450i
 Canon 455i
 Canon 470PD
 Canon 475PD
 Canon 550i
 Canon 560i
 Canon 850i
 Canon 860i
 Canon 865R
 Canon 900PD
 Canon 950i
 Canon 960i
 Canon 990i
 Canon 6100i
 Canon 6500i
 Canon 9100i
 Canon 9900i

SmartBase series 
 MPC190 aka F10
 MPC200 aka F20
 MPC360, MPC370, MPC390
 MPC400 aka F30 (based on S600)
 MPC600F aka F50 aka T-Fax 7960
 F60
 F80

MultiPASS Series 

 10
 C20
 C30
 C50
 C70
 C75
 C80
 C100
 C530
 C545
 C550
 C555
 C560
 C635
 C755
 C2500
 C3000
 C3500
 C5000

PIXMA series 
Since about 2005 Canon introduced a numbering scheme for some whereby the least significant (non-zero) digit signifies the geographic region ("3" signifying Japan) the device is sold in. This leads to a large number of models, all belonging to the same family, but possibly incompatible to some degree, and also makes it difficult to ascertain whether a device is unique or part of an existing family. The software driver filename will often use the family designation.

Some MP devices have fax capability (MP740).
R=remote

 Canon PIXMA G1000
 Canon PIXMA G1010
 Canon PIXMA G1020
 Canon PIXMA G2000
 Canon PIXMA G2010
 Canon PIXMA G2012
 Canon PIXMA G2020
 Canon PIXMA G2021
 Canon PIXMA G2060
 Canon PIXMA G2070
 Canon PIXMA G3000
 Canon PIXMA G3010
 Canon PIXMA G3012
 Canon PIXMA G3020
 Canon PIXMA G3021
 Canon PIXMA G3060
 Canon PIXMA G4000
 Canon PIXMA G4010
 Canon PIXMA G6070
 Canon PIXMA iP1000
 Canon PIXMA iP1200
 Canon PIXMA iP1300
 Canon PIXMA iP1500
 Canon PIXMA iP1600
 Canon PIXMA iP1700
 Canon PIXMA iP1800
 Canon PIXMA iP1980
 Canon PIXMA iP2000
 Canon PIXMA iP2200
 Canon PIXMA iP2500
 Canon PIXMA iP2600
 Canon PIXMA iP2700
 Canon PIXMA iP3000
 Canon PIXMA iP3100
 Canon PIXMA iP3300
 Canon PIXMA iP3500
 Canon PIXMA iP3600
 Canon PIXMA iP4000
 Canon PIXMA iP4000R
 Canon PIXMA iP4200
 Canon PIXMA iP4300
 Canon PIXMA iP4500
 Canon PIXMA iP4600
 Canon PIXMA iP4700
 Canon PIXMA iP4800 (iP4830)
 Canon PIXMA iP4850
 Canon PIXMA iP4900 (iP4930)
 Canon PIXMA iP5000
 Canon PIXMA iP5200
 Canon PIXMA iP5200R
 Canon PIXMA iP5300
 Canon PIXMA iP6000D
 Canon PIXMA iP6100D
 Canon PIXMA iP6210D
 Canon PIXMA iP6220D
 Canon PIXMA iP6310D
 Canon PIXMA iP6320D
 Canon PIXMA iP6600D
 Canon PIXMA iP6700D
 Canon PIXMA iP7100
 Canon PIXMA iP7200 (iP7230)
 Canon PIXMA iP7500
 Canon PIXMA iP8100
 Canon PIXMA iP8500
 Canon PIXMA iP8600
 Canon PIXMA iP8760
 Canon PIXMA iP9910
 Canon PIXMA iP90
 Canon PIXMA iP90v
 Canon PIXMA iP100
 Canon PIXMA mini220
 Canon PIXMA mini320
 Canon PIXMA mini360
 Canon PIXMA iX4000
 Canon PIXMA iX5000
 Canon PIXMA iX6500 (iX6530)
 Canon PIXMA iX7000
 Canon PIXMA MP110
 Canon PIXMA MP130
 Canon PIXMA MP140
 Canon PIXMA MP150
 Canon PIXMA MP160
 Canon PIXMA MP170
 Canon PIXMA MP180
 Canon PIXMA MP190
 Canon PIXMA MP210
 Canon PIXMA MP220
 Canon PIXMA MP230
 Canon PIXMA MP240
 Canon PIXMA MP250
 Canon PIXMA MP258
 Canon PIXMA MP260
 Canon PIXMA MP270
 Canon PIXMA MP280
 Canon PIXMA MP287
 Canon PIXMA MP360
 Canon PIXMA MP370
 Canon PIXMA MP375R
 Canon PIXMA MP390
 Canon PIXMA MP450
 Canon PIXMA MP460
 Canon PIXMA MP470
 Canon PIXMA MP480
 Canon PIXMA MP490
 Canon PIXMA MP493
 Canon PIXMA MP495
 Canon PIXMA MP500
 Canon PIXMA MP510
 Canon PIXMA MP520
 Canon PIXMA MP530
 Canon PIXMA MP540
 Canon PIXMA MP550
 Canon PIXMA MP560
 Canon PIXMA MP600
 Canon PIXMA MP600R
 Canon PIXMA MP610
 Canon PIXMA MP620
 Canon PIXMA MP630
 Canon PIXMA MP640
 Canon PIXMA MP700
 Canon PIXMA MP710
 Canon PIXMA MP730
 Canon PIXMA MP740
 Canon PIXMA MP750
 Canon PIXMA MP760
 Canon PIXMA MP780
 Canon PIXMA MP790
 Canon PIXMA MP800
 Canon PIXMA MP800R
 Canon PIXMA MP810
 Canon PIXMA MP830
 Canon PIXMA MP950
 Canon PIXMA MP960
 Canon PIXMA MP970
 Canon PIXMA MP980
 Canon PIXMA MP990
 Canon PIXMA MG2100
 Canon PIXMA MG2200
 Canon PIXMA MG2440
 Canon PIXMA MG2470
 Canon PIXMA MG3100
 Canon PIXMA MG3200
 Canon PIXMA MG4100
 Canon PIXMA MG4200
 Canon PIXMA MG5100
 Canon PIXMA MG5200
 Canon PIXMA MG5300
 Canon PIXMA MG5400
 Canon PIXMA MG5500
 Canon PIXMA MG5740
 Canon PIXMA MG6100
 Canon PIXMA MG6200
 Canon PIXMA MG6300
 Canon PIXMA MG8100
 Canon PIXMA MG8200
 Canon PIXMA MX300
 Canon PIXMA MX310
 Canon PIXMA MX320
 Canon PIXMA MX330
 Canon PIXMA MX340
 Canon PIXMA MX350
 Canon PIXMA MX360
 Canon PIXMA MX370
 Canon PIXMA MX410
 Canon PIXMA MX420
 Canon PIXMA MX430
 Canon PIXMA MX510
 Canon PIXMA MX700
 Canon PIXMA MX710
 Canon PIXMA MX7600
 Canon PIXMA MX850
 Canon PIXMA MX860
 Canon PIXMA MX870
 Canon PIXMA MX880
 Canon PIXMA MX882
 Canon PIXMA MX890
 Canon PIXMA MX892
 Canon PIXMA MX922
 Canon PIXMA MX924
 Canon PIXMA E480
 Canon PIXMA E500
 Canon PIXMA E600
 Canon PIXMA Pro9000
 Canon PIXMA Pro9000 Mark II
 Canon PIXMA Pro9500
 Canon PIXMA Pro9500 Mark II
 Canon PIXMA PRO-1
 Canon PIXMA PRO-10
 Canon PIXMA PRO-100

SELPHY series 

The DS700 and DS810 are inkjet printers; all the other models are thermal dye-sublimation printers.

 Canon SELPHY DS700
 Canon SELPHY DS810
 Canon SELPHY ES1
 Canon SELPHY ES2
 Canon SELPHY ES3
 Canon SELPHY ES20
 Canon SELPHY ES30
 Canon SELPHY ES40
 Canon SELPHY CP-10
 Canon SELPHY CP-100
 Canon SELPHY CP-200
 Canon SELPHY CP-220
 Canon SELPHY CP-300
 Canon SELPHY CP-330
 Canon SELPHY CP400
 Canon SELPHY CP500
 Canon SELPHY CP510
 Canon SELPHY CP520
 Canon SELPHY CP530
 Canon SELPHY CP600
 Canon SELPHY CP710
 Canon SELPHY CP720
 Canon SELPHY CP730
 Canon SELPHY CP740
 Canon SELPHY CP750
 Canon SELPHY CP760
 Canon SELPHY CP770
 Canon SELPHY CP780
 Canon SELPHY CP790
 Canon SELPHY CP800
 Canon SELPHY CP810
 Canon SELPHY CP820
 Canon SELPHY CP900
 Canon SELPHY CP910
 Canon SELPHY CP1000
 Canon SELPHY CP1200
 Canon SELPHY CP1300
 Canon SELPHY CP1500

S series 

 Canon S100
 Canon S200
 Canon S300
 Canon S330
 Canon S400
 Canon S450
 Canon S4500
 Canon S500
 Canon S520
 Canon S530D
 Canon S600
 Canon S630
 Canon S750
 Canon S800
 Canon S820
 Canon S820D
 Canon S830D
 Canon S900
 Canon S9000

Lenses

EF and EF-S line 
See Canon EF lenses for the product line-up.
See Canon EF-S lenses for the product line-up.

EF-S lenses are built for APS-C 1.6x crop sensors, so it will only work with models that use this sensor size, such as: Canon EOS Digital Rebel series (300D through 750D and 760D, 100D, and 1000D through 1200D), and newer cameras in the prosumer Canon EOS Digital series (20D through 80D, 20Da, 60Da, 7D, and 7D MkII). When EF-S lenses are used on a 35mm (full frame) camera, the back element will hit the mirror assembly or cause massive amounts of vignetting since the sensor is bigger than the image produced by the lens.

FD line 
See Canon FD lenses for the product line-up.

FL line 
See Canon FL lenses for the product line-up.

Rangefinder line 
 Canon 50mm f/0.95

Tilt-shift 
 Canon TS-E 17mm f/4L lens
 Canon TS-E 24mm f/3.5L lens and Canon TS-E 24mm f/3.5L II
 Canon TS-E 45mm f/2.8 lens
 Canon TS-E 90mm f/2.8 lens

Dedicated macro 
 Canon MP-E 65mm f/2.8 1–5x Macro

Note: Even though the tilt-shift and dedicated macro lenses are designated TS-E and MP-E respectively, these lenses are still compatible with the EF mount.

Broadcast Studio/Field Lenses 

 Canon UHD-DIGISUPER 27
 Canon DIGISUPER 60
 Canon UHD-DIGISUPER 66
 Canon DIGISUPER 76
 Canon DIGISUPER 80
 Canon UHD-DIGISUPER 86
 Canon DIGISUPER 86AF
 Canon UHD DIGISUPER 90
 Canon DIGISUPER 95
 Canon DIGISUPER 95 TELE
 Canon DIGISUPER 100
 Canon DIGISUPER 100AF
 Canon UHD-DIGISUPER 111
 Canon UHD-DIGISUPER 122
 Canon UHD-DIGISUPER 122AF

HDTV Studio Box Lenses 
 Canon DIGISUPER 22 xs
 Canon DIGISUPER 27AF

Cinema lens

Presenters 
 PR10-GC (PR10-G) – Green Laser Presenter with back light LCD & timer display
 PR100-RC (PR100-R) – Red Laser Presenter with back light LCD & timer display
 PR500-RC (PR500-R) – Red Laser Presenter
 PR1000-R – Pen-type Red Laser Presenter

Software 
Applications bundled with Canon Digital Cameras and printers include:
 PhotoStitch – image stitching software, used to join multiple photographs together to produce a composite pictures such as panoramas.
 Zoombrowser EX – Image organizer utility for viewing and transferring photos from digital camera to desktop computer.
 Digital Photo Professional is available for asset management and editing of downloaded images.
 CameraWindow DC – Image Downloader utility for transferring photos from digital camera to desktop computer (used by Zoombrowser EX).

Canon TrueType Font Pack 
Released in 1992, Canon TrueType Font Pack is a 3½-inch 1,44 MB floppy disk collection of supplementary truetype fonts bundled in selling box of some Canon printers of years '90 and useful for Windows 3.1 and 95.

The fonts contained in the collection were:

Accessories 

 Canon Deluxe Backpack 200 EG
 Canon TC 80N3 Remote Control
 BG-ED3 Battery Grip

References 
Notes

Sources

External links 
 Canon Inc.

Products
Technology-related lists
Lists of photography topics
Lists of products
Products by individual company